Madame Pompadour is an operetta in three acts, composed by Leo Fall with a libretto by Rudolph Schanzer and Ernst Welisch.

Translated into English, Madame Pompadour premiered at Daly's Theatre, London, on 20 December 1923. It was also translated into Italian and performed at the Teatro Dal Verme in Milan on 15 January 1924. It was later given in French in an adaptation by Albert Willemetz, Max Eddy and Jean Marietti, in Paris at the Théâtre Marigny on 16 May 1930. With the extraordinary success of the operetta in Berlin, Vienna, London and elsewhere, Fall regained the international fame that he had enjoyed prior to World War I. He died of cancer two years later at the age of only 52.

Roles

Synopsis
Married Count René is in Paris for Carnival, at an inn with his friend, the poet Josef. When René picks up an attractive girl, she is revealed to be Madame Pompadour, and he is placed under arrest. She gains him a reprieve, but she demands that he serve as her personal bodyguard and that Josef write a birthday play. She tells René to keep his distance – until midnight. Meanwhile, René’s wife arrives, in search of her missing husband, and Louis XV wants to catch his mistress together with her lover. But clever Madame Pompadour is able to avoid detection, as she presents René’s wife as her sister.

English adaptations
The first English adaptation, by Frederick Lonsdale and Harry Graham (lyrics), which opened at Daly's Theatre in London in 1923, ran for a very successful 469 performances. It starred Bertram Wallis as Louis XV, Derek Oldham as René, Huntley Wright as Joseph Calicott and Evelyn Laye in the title role.

A second English adaptation, in two acts, with a libretto adapted by Clare Kummer and lyrics by Rudolph Schanzer and Ernst Welisch, was produced on Broadway in 1924–25, starring Wilda Bennett. This was the opening production of the new Martin Beck Theatre.  Following the success of the London production, film and other versions were made.

Musical numbers (English adaptation)
Act 1
Introduction and ensemble (Calicot and Chorus)
Quintet (René and Girls) – "Carnival Time" ("Laridi, laridon! At carnivals the world must have a gay time")
Duet (Pompadour & Mariette) – "Love me Now" ("I feel so excited, I won't deny")
Duet (Pompadour and René) – "By the Light of the Moon" ("Grant favour, In that arbour your heart will grow braver")
Duet (Calicot and Mariette) – "If I were King" ("Though I'd feel a trifle strange")
Finale act 1

Act 2
Introduction and ensemble
Duet (Pompadour and René) – "Love's Sentry" ("Sentry 'shun, you're on parade now")
Sextet (Pompadour, Mariette, Madeleine and Three Maids) – "Tell me what your eyes were made for"
Serenade (René and Chorus of Soldiers) – "Madame Pompadour"
Duet (Pompadour and Calicot) – "Joseph!" ("Mine's a mad infatuation")
Reminiscence ... "Madame Pompadour"
Finale act 2

Act 3
Introduction
Duet (Calicot and Mariette) – "Two Little Birds" ("Though you're a girl I've gone simply mad about")
Finale act 3

Recordings

References

External links
 
London cast list and musical numbers

Site showing the number of performances of long-running shows

, Fritzi Massary
, film clip with Evelyn Laye as Madame Pompadour at Daly's Theatre, London (British Pathé)

1922 operas
Operas
Operas by Leo Fall
German-language operettas
Operas set in Paris
Cultural depictions of Louis XV
Cultural depictions of Madame de Pompadour